Mucilaginibacter rigui is a Gram-negative, aerobic, rod-shaped and non-motile bacterium from the genus of Mucilaginibacter which has been isolated from freshwater from the Woopo wetland in Korea.

References

External links
Type strain of Mucilaginibacter rigui at BacDive -  the Bacterial Diversity Metadatabase

Sphingobacteriia
Bacteria described in 2010